Derrick Leon Witherspoon (born February 14, 1971) is a former American football and Canadian football running back and return specialist in the Canadian Football League (CFL) and National Football League (NFL). He played in the CFL for the Shreveport Pirates and the NFL for the Philadelphia Eagles. He played college football at Clemson.

References

1971 births
Living people
Sportspeople from Sumter, South Carolina
Players of American football from South Carolina
American football running backs
Canadian football running backs
American football return specialists
Clemson Tigers football players
Shreveport Pirates players
Philadelphia Eagles players